Teigan Collister (born 25 January 2000) is an Australian soccer player who plays for Sydney FC in the A-League Women. She has previously played for Newcastle Jets and Western Sydney Wanderers.

Club career

Newcastle Jets
Collister played her first season in 2018–19, where she played in 11 games and started in 5 of those, scoring twice. One of those goals was selected as the goal of the round against Western Sydney Wanderers in the final round of the season.

Collister was in a group of three who were the last players to be added to the Jets' list for the 2018–19 season, and she was seen as an unknown quantity, but in a season that was marred with suspensions and injury the Jets were forced to promote their younger players, including Collister. Her playing style was seen as less predictable by her coach Craig Deans, but signed her on the back of her enthusiasm and raw talent.

She was re-signed by Newcastle for the 2019–20 season.

Western Sydney Wanderers
In October 2020, Collister joined Western Sydney Wanderers.

Western Sydney Wanderers FC announce the re-signing of forward Teigan Collister for 2021-22 A League Women season

Sydney FC
In January 2023, Collister joined Sydney FC until the end of the 2022–23 A-League Women season.

International career
Australian U20 vs Canada 2017

References

2000 births
Living people
Australian women's soccer players
Newcastle Jets FC (A-League Women) players
Western Sydney Wanderers FC (A-League Women) players
Sydney FC (A-League Women) players
A-League Women players
Women's association football forwards